Wenzu Vella (5 March 1924 – 27 April 2003) was a Maltese sports shooter. He competed in the trap event at the 1960 Summer Olympics.

References

External links
 

1924 births
2003 deaths
Maltese male sport shooters
Olympic shooters of Malta
Shooters at the 1960 Summer Olympics